William Frederick Faulds  (19 February 1895 – 16 February 1950) was a South African soldier, and recipient of the Victoria Cross, the highest and most prestigious award for gallantry in the face of the enemy that can be awarded to British and Commonwealth forces. He was the first South African-born man serving with South African Forces to be awarded the VC.

Faulds was born 19 February 1895. When he was 21 years old, and a private in 1st Regiment, 1st South African Infantry Brigade during the First World War, he was awarded the Victoria Cross for his actions on 18 July 1916 at Delville Wood, France.

The citation reads as follows:

As a temporary Lieutenant, Faulds was also awarded the Military Cross for actions at Hedicourton 22 March 1918. This citation, for the Military Cross reads:

He later achieved the rank of captain. He served in the Second World War in Italian Somaliland and Abyssinia with Rhodesian forces. He died 16 February 1950 and was buried in Pioneer Cemetery, Harare, Zimbabwe.

Other medals awarded to Faulds were the 1914-1915 Star, the British War Medal 1914-1920, the Allied Victory Medal 1914-1918 (South African issue), the 1939-1945 Star, the Africa Star, the Defence Medal 1939-1945, the War Medal 1939-1945, the Africa Service Medal and the King George VI Coronation Medal 1937.

The Medal
His Victoria Cross was displayed at the National Museum of Military History in Johannesburg. This Victoria Cross and his other medals were stolen off a display in 1994 and are still missing.

The insurance money from the loss of the medals contributed to the building of the Capt W F Faulds VC MC Centre at the museum; the Centre consists of conference and function facilities.

References

Monuments to Courage (David Harvey, 1999)
The Register of the Victoria Cross (This England, 1997)
VCs of the First World War - The Somme (Gerald Gliddon, 1994)

External links
 1st Infantry Brigade (South Africa)
 Delville Wood
 

South African World War I recipients of the Victoria Cross
Battle of the Somme recipients of the Victoria Cross
1895 births
1950 deaths
Recipients of the Military Cross
South African Army officers
People from Cradock, Eastern Cape